The prime minister of the Republic of Korea is the deputy head of government and the second highest political office of South Korea who is appointed by the President of the Republic of Korea, with the National Assembly's approval. The prime minister may be a member of the National Assembly, but this is not required to hold the office. The prime minister of South Korea is not the head of government of South Korea, for the President is both the head of state and government in the country.

Han Duck-soo is the current prime minister.  He took the office on 20 May 2022.

Nomenclature 
The Sino-Korean word gukmu (/) means "state affairs" and chongri (/) means "prime minister", "premier" or "chancellor", so the full title in Korean means literally "Prime Minister for State Affairs", but it is not used as official English title. The short title in Korean is just Chongri.

History 
The position was created on 31 July 1948, two weeks before the government of South Korea was founded, and was held by Lee Beom-seok until 1950. The title was Chief Cabinet Minister from 1961 until 1963.

On 27 April 2014, Prime Minister Chung Hong-won announced his desire to resign. However, due to unsuccessful nominations, Chung remained in office until February 2015.

On 23 January 2015, President Park Geun-hye named Saenuri's Floor Leader Lee Wan-koo as the new prime minister. Lee was confirmed by the National Assembly as Prime Minister on 16 February 2015. However, on April 20 of the same year, he offered his resignation to the President in the midst of a bribery scandal.

Functions 
The prime minister is the principal executive assistant to the president, with the president being the actual head of government, but not the prime minister. The prime minister holds the second position after the president in the State Council of South Korea, which is the nominal cabinet of South Korea. The prime minister assists the president by supervising ministries, making recommendations for ministers, and serves as the vice-chairman of the Cabinet. The prime minister is the first in the order of succession to discharge the duties of the office of the president as the acting president should the president be unable to discharge her or his office. The most recent person to have served as Acting President was Hwang Kyo-ahn, during the impeachment of Park Geun-hye in 2016. The role of the Prime Minister is more akin to the Vice President of the United States than it is to the Prime Ministers of parliamentary democracies. 

A prime minister that has been appointed by the president but not yet confirmed by the National Assembly is informally called as the acting prime minister. The term may also be applied to a prime minister that has resigned but in the interim remains in office in a caretaker role.

The prime minister is supported by two deputy prime ministers. The prime minister of South Korea sometimes holds some professional or technological knowledge whereas the president is always a sole politician.

Removal
The procedure for impeachment is set out in the 10th Constitution of South Korea in 1987. And according to Article 65 Clause 1, if the president, prime minister, or other state council members violate the Constitution or other laws of official duty, the National Assembly can impeach them.

Clause 2 states the impeachment bill must be proposed by one third, and approved by the majority of members of the National Assembly for passage. In the case of the president, the motion must be proposed by a majority and approved by two thirds or more of the total members of the National Assembly, meaning that 200 of 300 members of the parliament must approve the bill. This article also states that any person against whom a motion for impeachment has been passed shall be suspended from exercising his/her power until the impeachment has been adjudicated, and a decision on impeachment shall not extend further than removal from public office. However, impeachment shall not exempt the person impeached from civil or criminal liability for such violations.

By the Constitutional Court Act of 1988, the Constitutional Court must make a final decision within 180 days after it receives any case for adjudication, including impeachment cases. If the respondent has already left office before the pronouncement of the decision, the case is dismissed.

Prime Minister's Office 

The Prime Minister's Office consists of two organisations - Office for Government Policy Coordination and Prime Minister's Secretariat which are led by ministerial-level minister for government policy coordination and vice-ministerial-level chief of staff to the prime minister respectively.

Office for Government Policy Coordination assists the prime minister with:
 various tasks, responsible for directing, adjusting and overseeing central administrative authorities underneath the Prime Minister's Office;
 planning and adjusting key national policies;
 managing, analyzing and assessing policies in regard to social risks, conflicts and pending problems;
 implementing regulatory reform;
 and doing other tasks specifically delegated by the prime minister.

Prime Minister's Secretariat assists the prime minister with: 
 activities related to the National Assembly, responsible for matters regarding collaboration between the executive branch and the majority party in the legislature;
 providing PM with counsel on state affairs;
 matters regarding key information and situations both domestic and international;
 management and arbitration of civil complaints;
 supporting and collaborating with civil groups;
 promoting PM's activities in relation to state affairs;
 drafting PM's remarks and statements;
 supporting the promotion of activities by the Office for Government Policy Coordination;
 protocols and armed escort regarding PM and receiving VIPs;
 maintaining the official residence of PM;
 and handling other matters as instructed by PM.

Salary
The prime minister has a salary of $163,000 as set by the National Assembly along with a lifelong pension that is always given to former prime ministers.

Residence
The prime minister's residence is Chongri Gonggwan. It is owned and operated by the South Korean Government, and has served as the residence of the Prime Minister since the early 1990s after construction was concluded and was completed around the same time as the Presidential Blue House.

Post-premiership
All former prime ministers are given a lifelong pension and a Presidential Security Service detail but do not have to accept the protection if they so wish. Prime ministers when they die usually have a state funeral so the public and government officials both past and present can pay their respects.

Lists of prime ministers

See also 
Prime Minister of Korea (1895–1910; Korean Empire)
Politics of South Korea
Premier of North Korea

References

External links 
 
 

 
Government of South Korea
1948 establishments in South Korea